Rhathamictis nocturna is a moth of the Psychidae family. It was described by Clarke in 1888. It is found in New Zealand.

References

 Rhathamictis nocturna in species id

Moths described in 1888
Psychidae
Moths of New Zealand